Portrait of a Man in a Red Hat is an 1465-1470 oil on oak panel painting by Hans Memling, one of the first portraits he produced in Bruges, with similarities to his Portrait of a Man - its subject is unknown. It has some similarities to portraits by Jan van Eyck and Rogier van der Weyden, though the fictive stone frame is Memling's invention.

In 1823 it was bought by L.J. Nieuwenhuys, who later sold it to prince William of Orange. It was bought at the auction of William's collection in 1850 by its present owner, the Städelsches Kunstinstitut und Städtische Galerie, in Frankfurt am Main.

Sources
 Till-Holger Borchert, De portretten van Memling (tentoonstelling Brugge 2005), Ludion, 2005 (nummer 1), p. 151.

1460s paintings
Man in a Red Hat
Man in a Red Hat
Paintings in the collection of the Städel